Dziennik Bałtycki (lit. Baltic Daily) is a local newspaper in Pomerania, Poland, since 1945. Its circulation is about 150,000.

External links
 Homepage

Newspapers published in Poland
Newspapers established in 1945